Crew972 is an Israeli 3D animation studio that provides 3D animation services and develops and creates original animated entertainment.

History

Crew 972 is a limited liability company founded in Tel Aviv Israel in 2005 for the purpose of creating animated entertainment. It is a production company that provides animation services from concept to finished frames and is developing original properties . It was co founded in 2005 by Alex and Michelle Orrelle. Crew972 - named after Israel's international dialing code

Management
President and Co-founder Alex Orrelle spend eight years in San Francisco, where he worked on Disney/Pixar's The Incredibles, Finding Nemo, Boundin''', and the Monsters, Inc. DVD; and on Manex Entertainment/Warner Bros. The Matrix Reloaded.  During his studies, Alex made two award winning traditional animated short films and created and directed the CG short film Freeware, the 2001 winner of the Sundance On-Line Film Festival.  Alex holds a BA in Fine Arts.

In 2009, Alex was offered the position of Animation Director on Yogi Bear (Dec 2010 release) for Warner Bros. Pictures.

Business Development Manager and Co-founder Michelle Orrelle has produced CD-ROM titles and online software in the U.S., Israel, and Australia at OZ.com, Scient, Macromedia, and the NSW Board of Studies.  She also assisted Austrade with business development in San Francisco.  Michelle holds a B.A. in Visual Arts, M.A. in Design, and M.B.A.

Dror Daliot (LLB, MBA) Head of Studio, was General Manager of Tal Yefet fashion house. Prior to that he managed teams in the former Soviet Union for the Israeli Ministry of Foreign Affairs ("Nativ" division), and ran cultural seminars. Dror interned at a top labor law office with former Director General of the Israeli Ministry of Justice on Supreme Court macro-economic cases. His academic pursuits included the development of a mathematical model for refund policy at the University of Bar-Ilan. He has also written and co-hosted radio sketches.

Menashe Morobuse  Head of 3D, graduated from Bezalel Academy of Arts and Design, Jerusalem in 2005.  Due to his extensive knowledge in pipeline development and CG supervising, Menashe was appointed Head of TD for Animation Lab in 2006. Menashe has worked as Lead TD and CG supervisor in Israeli advertisement productions and post production companies, including Broadcast and JCS. He has taught 3D arts at Bezalel, Minshar and the IDC.

Doron Meir, Head of Animation, is a storyboard artist, character designer and animation director with 15 years of 2D and CG animation experience. He helped to create  the feature film Asterix and the Vikings, computer games (Hitman), commercials and TV series.
 
Ron Ganbar (MA Feature Film) Head of 2D, has worked in cinematic and commercial compositing since 1995. His film credits include Sunshine (Fox Searchlight, 2007) and Fred Clause (Warner Bros., 2007).

Projects
Cartoon Network The Looney Tunes Show Wile E. Coyote and the Road Runner segments
Cartoon Network "Nood" bumpers aired from July 14, 2008 – May 28, 2010.
"Adrenaline Lemmings" Animation Test (45 sec, HD Video and 3D animation hybrid) Proof of concept for a series of branded shorts developed for Disney Short Films. Crew 972 created a concept about four adrenaline junkie lemmings that get into trouble by performing extreme stunts in search of the highest high.
 Experimental short film, combining flash animation (Irma, the driver) of a 3D car, composited over a still illustrated background.
  "FIFA World Cup Trophy Tour by Coca-Cola" (3 min, Stereoscopic 3D animation) - Made for the 2006 World Cup Soccer championship, this is a segment from a seven-minute film which accompanied the trophy exhibition that traveled through 32 countries.
 "Order-Up!" Cinematic (3 min, 3D animation) Crew 972 animated 3 cinematic scenes and twenty in-game animation clips for Order-Up!, a Nintendo-Wii game developed by Super Villain Studios.
 Sir Billi, animated film starring the voices of Sir Sean Connery, Alan Cumming, and Miriam Margolyes. The film was released in 2010 with the theme song performed by Dame Shirley Bassey.
 "Danone Actimel" TV commercial (30 sec, 3D animation) Produced by Crew 972 for Y&R Israel, characters were animated in 3D and rendered to look like classic animation.
 "Bomb Monkey" (15 sec, 3D animation) Game developer Super Villain Studios hired Crew 972 to produce a logo sequence starring their logo character. The character, planes and bombs were animated in 3D, then rendered in an inky flat palette to resemble the graphic novel illustration style in the logo.
 "Perez 2" Character Animation (3D animation) Crew 972 was hired to animate 20 minutes of a feature film by Filmax (Madrid), which provided storyboards and 3D models.
 "Pet Rock Monster" Proof of Concept (16 sec, 2D animation) Animation test for a mobile game concept by Crew 972, involving music and virtual pets.
 "Slottsville" Gaming website  Crew 972 was hired to design and animated 3D environments and 2D characters in a retro cartoon style.
 The Tempest Crew 972 produced animated “lava dogs” as visual effects on the motion picture The Tempest (Directed by Julie Taymor).
 *Vipo: Adventures of the Flying Dog - over five hours of an animated television show for children
3 minutes of high-end stereoscopic animation for the FIFA World Cup Tour sponsored by Coca-Cola
Sci-Fi "If" Campaign (4x5 seconds)
20 minutes for the Bratz Interactive DVD
PepsiCo for internet and television
Eyeball NYC "Bella Sara"
CandyLab for Sony PSP
Japanese TV (client Eyeball)
Mountain Dew
Leo Burnett
Ogilvy and MatherMedal of Honor Airborne'' for Electronic Arts
Introduction Animation for Pro Evolution Soccer 6

References

External links
 

Israeli animation studios
Visual effects companies
Mass media companies established in 2005
Mass media in Tel Aviv